Pesceana is a commune located in Vâlcea County, Oltenia, Romania. It is composed of six villages: Cermegești, Lupoaia, Negraia, Pesceana, Roești and Ursoaia.

References

Communes in Vâlcea County
Localities in Oltenia